The Alberta Pandas ice hockey team represents the University of Alberta in the Canada West Universities Athletic Association of U Sports. Since joining U Sports (then called the Canadian Interuniversity Athletics Union, followed by Canadian Interuniversity Sport in 2001) in 1997, the women's ice hockey team has been led by head coach Howie Draper. The program has won the most Canada West conference championships with 14 and the most U Sports national championships with eight.

On January 25, 2011, it was announced that the 1999-2000 University of Alberta Pandas hockey team would be inducted into the Alberta Hockey Hall of Fame.

Early years
In the era of the First World War, the University of Alberta formed men's ice hockey and women's ice hockey teams. The women's team played many community based teams.
The University of Alberta played the Edmonton Monarchs in the Monarchs first ever game in 1918.
The city of Edmonton would organize women's ice hockey into three divisions in 1930: junior, intermediate and senior. The Edmonton Monarchs and the University of Alberta were the only teams that comprised the senior division. In that same year, the University of Alberta would challenge the Edmonton Monarchs for the Alpine Cup. The Monarchs prevailed by a 1–0 score. By 1934, the University of Alberta was demoted to the intermediate division.
In 1937, the University of Alberta competed for the Alpine Cup, contested at the Banff Winter Carnival. The club lost to the Calgary Avenue Grills team.

U Sports
On March 14, 2004, the Pandas won their third consecutive National Championship and their fourth in five years. The Pandas became the first team to win three consecutive championships which remains unmatched as of 2020. The win came courtesy of a 2-0 tally over the Ottawa Gee-Gees. For the season, the Pandas went 20-0-0 in Canada West play, 7–0 in the postseason, and a 35-0-0 overall mark.
U Sports Player of the Year Danielle Bourgeois scored both goals in the game as Alberta outshot Ottawa 45-14 overall. The game-winning goal was assisted by Canadian national team member Delaney Collins. With the triumph, the Pandas ran their undefeated streak against U Sports opponents to 81 games. During the streak, their last loss to a U Sports team was on Oct. 13, 2001.

On March 14, 2010, the Pandas won the Canadian Interuniversity Sport women's ice hockey championship which was their seventh title in the 13 years since the tournament's inception. In the gold-medal game, they defeated the McGill Martlets by a score of 2–0. While the program did not have as much of a dominant national run in the next decade, the team managed to claim their eighth national championship in 2017 after once again defeating the Martlets in double overtime by a score of 2–1. It was also the first time that the Pandas had won the National championship while not winning their conference championship in the same year.

Due to the COVID-19 pandemic in Canada and financial reasons, the University of Alberta announced that the Pandas would not participate in the 2020–21 season, if one were to be held.
Former Pandas Hockey defender, Taylor Kezama, a 2017 U Sports National Champion, and a 2019 Canada West champion, was one of 18 former U Sports student-athletes announced among the inaugural participants of the U SPORTS Female Apprenticeship Coach Program..

Year by year

Awards and honours

U Sports honours
Brodrick Trophy (U Sports Most Valuable Player): Lori Shupak (2002), Danielle Bourgeois (2004, 2005), Lindsay McAlpine (2007), Tarin Podloski (2009), Alex Poznikoff (2019)
U Sports Rookie of the Year: Danielle Bourgeois (2000), Madison Willan (2020)
Marion Hillard Award (Student-Athlete Community Service): Taryn Barry (2007), Janelle Froehler (2016)
Fox 40 U Sports Coach of the Year award: Howie Draper (2002, 2004, 2009, 2019)
Kirsten Chamberlin, U Sports Athlete of the Month, February 2020

U Sports Tournament honours
U Sports Championship Most Valuable Player: Danielle Bourgeois (2002, 2004), Tarin Podloski (2006), Lindsay McAlpine (2007), Stephanie Ramsay (2010), Lindsey Post (2017)

All-Canadian selections
Danielle Bourgeois, 2003 CIS First Team All-Canadian
Judy Diduck, 2003 CIS Second Team All-Canadian
Lori Shupak, 2003 CIS Second Team All-Canadian
Danielle Bourgeois, 2004 CIS First Team All-Canadian
Delaney Collins, 2004 CIS First Team All-Canadian
Judy Diduck, 2004 CIS First Team All-Canadian
Kristen Hagg, 2006 CIS First Team All-Canadian
Tarin Podloski, 2006 CIS Second-Team All-Canadian
Lindsay McAlpine, 2007 CIS First Team All-Canadian
Tarin Podloski, 2007 CIS Second Team All-Canadian
Rayanee Reeve, 2007 CIS Second Team All-Canadian
Nicole Pratt, 2010 All-CIS Second Team selection
Tarin Podloski, 2010 All-CIS Second Team selection

All-Rookie Team selections
Jessica Kampjes: 2012-13 USports All-Rookie Team

Canada West honors

Canada West All-Stars
Autumn MacDougall, Forward, 2017-18 Canada West First-Team
Alex Poznikoff, Forward, 2017-18 Canada West First-Team
Cayle Dillon, Defense, 2017-18 Canada West Second-Team
Taylor Kezama, Defense, 2017-18 Canada West Second-Team
Madison Willan, Forward, 2022-23 Canada West Second-Team

Canada West All-Rookie
Abby Krzyzaniak , Defense, 2017-18 Canada West All-Rookie

Team MVP

University honours
Kristen Haag: 2021 inductee - University of Alberta Sports Wall of Fame

International

Winter Universiade
Andrea Boras  2009 Winter Universiade, 2011 Winter Universiade (gold medal)
Leah Copeland : 2009 Winter Universiade
Jennifer Newton : 2009 Winter Universiade
Stephanie Ramsay : 2009 Winter Universiade 
Rayanne Reeve : 2009 Winter Universiade
Tess Houston : 2015 Winter Universiade
Jessica Kampjes : 2015 Winter Universiade
Alex Poznikoff, Forward, : 2017 Winter Universiade
Madison Willan, Forward, : 2023 Winter Universiade  (gold medal)

Olympians

Pandas in pro hockey

Pandas selected in the CWHL Draft
The following were selected in the 2010 CWHL Draft.

References

External links
 Official website

 
Ice hockey teams in Edmonton
U Sports women's ice hockey teams
Women's ice hockey teams in Canada
Ice hockey teams in Alberta